, better known as , is a Japanese actress who is represented by the talent agency, Toho Entertainment. Her skills are dancing and horseback riding. She is currently a regular model for Mart. Her husband is footballer Masashi Nakayama.

Biography
After starring in some work as a child actress, in 1983, Ikuta debuted in the film, Vienna Story: Gemini • Y and S (Vienna Monogatari Gemini Y to S). She graduated from Yamazaki Gakuen Fujimi High School and Japan Women's College of Physical Education. In 1996, Ikuta married Júbilo Iwata professional footballer Masashi Nakayama.

In 2004, they had their first child. Ikuta dubbed in the South Korean drama, Dae Jang Geum. She is also a mother tarento and worked as a model.

In 2011, with her husband, they won 4th Platinum Couple Awards.

Filmography

TV series

Films

References

External links
Official profile 
 

Japanese actresses
1967 births
Living people
People from Itabashi